"A Dozen Red Roses" is a song recorded by American country music artist Tammy Graham.  It was released in March 1997 as the second single from the album Tammy Graham.  The song reached #37 on the Billboard Hot Country Singles & Tracks chart.  The song was written by Archie Jordan, John Greenebaum and Carrie Folks.

Joan Kennedy also recorded the song on her 1997 album of the same name.

Critical reception
A review in Billboard of Graham's version was favorable, stating that it "is a real tear jerker in the finest country tradition" while praising her voice.

Chart performance

Tammy Graham

Joan Kennedy

References

1997 singles
1997 songs
Tammy Graham songs
Joan Kennedy (musician) songs
Songs written by Archie Jordan
Song recordings produced by Barry Beckett
Arista Records singles
Songs written by John Greenebaum